Calliostoma nudum is a species of sea snail, a marine gastropod mollusc in the family Calliostomatidae.

Description
The size of the shell varies between 6 mm and 16 mm.

Distribution
This marine species occurs off Argentina, Tierra del Fuego, Straits of Magellan, and Chile.

References

 Rochebrune, A.-T. and J. Mabille. 1889. Mollusques. Mission Scientifique du Cap Horn. 1882-1883 6: H.1-H.129, pls. 1-8 
 Strebel, H. 1905. Beiträge zur Kenntnis der Molluskenfauna der Magalhaen-Provinz. II. Die Trochiden. Zoologische Jahrbücher, Supplement 8: 121–166, pl. 5
 Strebel, H. 1908. Die Gastropoden (mit Ausnahme de nackten Opisthobranchier). Wissenschaftliche Ergebnisse der Schwedischen Südpolar-Expedition 1901-1903 6(1): 111 pp., 6 pls.

External links
 To Encyclopedia of Life
 To World Register of Marine Species
 Gastropods.com: Calliostoma nuda (sic.)

nudum
Gastropods described in 1845